The Franz Liszt Chamber Orchestra (Liszt Ferenc Kamarazenekar) is a chamber orchestra based in Budapest, Hungary.

The Franz Liszt Chamber Orchestra took the name of the great composer, to pay homage to the genius who became inseparable with the establishment of Hungarian music and whose spirit irradiates the musical life of the entire world. After having studied for years at the Franz Liszt Academy in Budapest, the Orchestra made its debut in 1963 and since then has played a very significant role in Hungarian and international musical life.

The Franz Liszt Chamber Orchestra consists of 17 strings, with the addition of other instruments as needed (harpsichord, winds, etc.)

External links
Franz Liszt Chamber Orchestra website

Hungarian orchestras
Chamber orchestras
Musical groups established in 1963
1963 establishments in Hungary
Franz Liszt